Plunge Into Darkness is a 1978 Australian television film directed by Peter Maxwell and starring Olivia Hamnett, Bruce Barry, and John Jarratt. It concerns a couple on a holiday in the country who have a terrorising experience.

It was produced by Robert Bruning's Gemini Productions.

Plot
A married couple, Gary and Pat Keating, come across a remote farmhouse containing a murdered couple and a boy. Pat stays with the boy why Gary runs for help. Gary crosses with two escaped prisoners.

Cast
Olivia Hamnett as Pat Keating
 Bruce Barry as Gary Keating
John Jarratt as Toby
Tom Richards as Joe
Ashley Grenville
Wallas Eaton
Alister Smart
John Ewart

Production
Filming was complete by June 1977.

References

External links

Plunge into Darkness at Screen Australia
Plunge Into Darkness at Peter Malone
Plunge Into Darkness at AustLit (subscription required)
Plunge Into Darkness at National Film and Sound Archive

Australian television films
1978 television films
1978 films
1970s English-language films
Films directed by Peter Maxwell
1970s Australian films